The Walter Keene House is a historic house at 28 High Street in Stoneham, Massachusetts.  The -story wood-frame building was built c. 1900, and is an excellent local example of a transitional Queen Anne-Colonial Revival house.  Its hip roof and front porch are typically Colonial Revival, while the left-side turret and turned posts and balusters are Queen Anne.  The house was built Walter Keene, a local shoe salesman and banker who was responsible for developing much of the surrounding area. Stoneham's Keene Street is named for him.

The house was listed on the National Register of Historic Places in 1984.

See also
National Register of Historic Places listings in Stoneham, Massachusetts
National Register of Historic Places listings in Middlesex County, Massachusetts

References

Houses in Stoneham, Massachusetts
Houses on the National Register of Historic Places in Stoneham, Massachusetts
Queen Anne architecture in Massachusetts
Colonial Revival architecture in Massachusetts
1890s architecture in the United States